Hepatic porphyrias is a form of porphyria in which toxic porphyrin molecules build up in the liver. Hepatic porphyrias can result from a number of different enzyme deficiencies.

Examples include (in order of synthesis pathway):
 Acute intermittent porphyria
 Porphyria cutanea tarda and Hepatoerythropoietic porphyria
 Hereditary coproporphyria
 Variegate porphyria

See also
 Erythropoietic porphyria
 Givosiran

References

External links 

 
 www.drugs-porphyria.com
 www.porphyria-europe.com

Porphyrias